This page is a timeline of the major events in the history of animal welfare and rights in the United States.

Big picture

Timeline

See also 

Timeline of animal welfare and rights
Timeline of animal welfare and rights in Europe
Animal welfare in the United States
Animal welfare and rights in China
Animal welfare and rights in India
Animal rights movement
Universal Declaration on Animal Welfare

References 

United States
Animal welfare and rights in the United States
United States